Durocher is a village in the Dame-Marie commune of the Anse d'Hainault Arrondissement, in the Grand'Anse department of Haiti.

References

Populated places in Grand'Anse (department)